Roland Lemar (born May 17, 1976) is an American politician who has served in the Connecticut House of Representatives from the 96th district since 2011.
Lemar serves as the House Chair of the Transportation Committee, the Co-Chair of the Finance Subcommittee for Transportation Bonding and a member of the Planning and Development Committee. Lemar also serves as a statutory  member of the Commission on Connecticut Future and Development and as Sub-Committee co-chair for Municipal Housing Development Plans.

Prior to joining the Connecticut State Legislature, Lemar served on the City of New Haven Board of Alders and as a Commissioner and Acting-Chair of the New Haven City Plan Commission.

References

1976 births
Living people
Democratic Party members of the Connecticut House of Representatives
21st-century American politicians